Damghar Yousafzai is a village in the Swat District of Khyber Pakhtunkhwa, Pakistan. It is located adjacent to the Swat River.

References

Populated places in Swat District